Matthew ap David Edwards, later known as Matthew Davies  was an English or Welsh politician who sat in the House of Commons.

In 1604, he was elected Member of Parliament for Cardiff. He was re-elected MP for Cardiff in 1614.

References

Year of birth missing
1615 deaths
Members of the Parliament of England (pre-1707) for constituencies in Wales
Politicians from Cardiff
English MPs 1604–1611
English MPs 1614